The Man from Jamaica (French: L'homme de la Jamaïque) is a 1950 French adventure film directed by Maurice de Canonge and starring Pierre Brasseur, Véra Norman and Georges Tabet.

The film's sets were designed by the art director Robert Dumesnil. It was shot on location in Paris and Tangiers in Morocco.

Cast
 Pierre Brasseur as Jacques Mervel
 Véra Norman as Vicky Blanchard
 Georges Tabet as Pablo Lopez
 Marcelle Géniat as Madame Milleris
 Louis Seigner as Capitaine Hoggan
 Nicolas Amato as Le domestique de Lopez 
 Jean-Roger Caussimon as Docteur Van Boeken
 Jany Vallières as Marguerite
 Simone Laure as Anita
 Félix Oudart as Le commissaire 
 Jean Pignol as   Navari  
 Daniel Lecourtois as Docteur Marc Heckart 
 Alexandre Rignault as Rapal

References

Bibliography 
 Goble, Alan. The Complete Index to Literary Sources in Film. Walter de Gruyter, 1999.

External links 
 

1950 films
French adventure films
1950 adventure films
1950s French-language films
Films directed by Maurice de Canonge
Films set in Tangier
Films set in Paris
French black-and-white films
1950s French films